The  Asian and Oceanina zone is one of three zones of regional Davis Cup competition in 2009.

Group I

Notes

 defeated  4–1 in a 1st round tie on 6–8 February in Hsinchuang, Chinese Taipei.
In the final round of Asia/Oceania Group play, Australia refused to play India, citing security concerns about the scheduled site of Chennai.  By forfeiting, India automatically advances to the World Group Play-offs.

Group II

Group III

Top two teams advance to 1st–4th Play-off, bottom two teams advance to 5th–8th Play-off. Scores in italics carried over from pools.

Pacific Oceania and  promoted to Group II in 2010.
 and  relegated to Group IV in 2010.

Group IV

External links
Davis Cup draw details

 
Asia Oceania
Davis Cup Asia/Oceania Zone